Hennigsdorf is a town in the district of Oberhavel, in Brandenburg, Germany. It is situated north-west of Berlin, just across the city border, which is formed mainly by the Havel river.

History

The municipality shared its borders with the former West Berlin, and so during the period 1961–1990 it was separated from it by the Berlin Wall.

In 1951/2, the Havel Canal was constructed to link Hennigsdorf with Paretz, thus avoiding a passage through the reach of the River Havel, between Spandau and Potsdam, that was under the political control of West Berlin. The canal is still in use, providing a shorter route for shipping from west of Berlin to the Oder–Havel Canal and Poland.

Geography

Subdivision
Hennigsdorf consists of 3 districts:
 Hennigsdorf
 Nieder Neuendorf (since 1923)
 Stolpe-Süd (since May 1, 1998)

Neighbouring places
 Velten
 Hohen Neuendorf
 Berlin
 Schönwalde-Glien
 Oberkrämer

Twin towns – sister cities

Hennigsdorf is twinned with:

 Alsdorf, Germany
 Choisy-le-Roi, France
 Kralupy nad Vltavou, Czech Republic
 Środa Wielkopolska, Poland

Economy
Located in Hennigsdorf  is the Bombardier LEW Hennigsdorf train factory and a steel smelter.

Sport
Hennigsdorf is home to Stahl Hennigsdorf Rugby, a rugby union club. The team, formed in 1948 under the leadership of Erwin Thiesies, was the most successful side during the East German era of the town, having won 27 national championships from 1952 to 1990.

Demography

Notable people

Michael Hartmann (born 1974), footballer
Frank Klawonn (born 1966), rower
Dirk Kummer (born 1966), actor, director, writer
Martin Männel (born 1988), footballer
Erich Muhsfeldt (1913–1948), SS officer at Auschwitz and Majdanek concentration camps executed for war crimes
Erich Priebke (1913–2013), Nazi war criminal
Karsten Schmeling (born 1962), rower
Erwin Thiesies (1908–1993), rugby union player who died in Hennigsdorf

See also
LEW Hennigsdorf, large rail vehicle factory located in Hennigsdorf

References

External links

 

Localities in Oberhavel